The following is a partial list of former primary state highways in the U.S. state of Virginia. Long-distance routes are listed here, while those entirely or mostly within one VDOT district are at the following pages:
Bristol District: 59-98 (1933), 65 (1940), 77 (1940), 78 (1940), 289 (1934)
Salem District: 99-124 (1933), 245 (1940), 294 (1935)
Lynchburg District: 125-135 (1933), 150-152 (1933), 283 (1933), 126 (1948), 158 (1947), 297 (1935)
Richmond District 136-149 (1933), 153-163 (1933), 197 (1933), 4 Alt. (1935), 33 Alt. (1937), 44 (1933), 336 (1938), 416-418 (1981)
Hampton Roads (formerly Suffolk) District: 164-196 (1933), 32 (1933), 33 (1933), 88 (1940), 152 (ca. 1943), 163 (1945), 192 (1951), 285-288 (1933), 305 (1941), 312 (1937), 407-411 (1981), 414 (1981)
Fredericksburg District: 198-229 (1933), 124 (ca. 1937), 209 (1957), 229 (ca. 1936), 293 (1935)
Culpeper and Northern Virginia Districts: 230-248 (1933), 110 (1947), 253 (1967), 275 (1941), 335 (ca. 1938)
Staunton District: 249-282 (1933), 59 (1940), 158 (1940), 261 (1940), 278 (1940), 284 (1935), 292 (1935)

Historic numbers for current routes are listed at list of primary state highways in Virginia.

SR 14

State Route 14 was a primary state highway in the U.S. state of Virginia. It was formed as part of the initial system in 1918, and always ran from the North Carolina state line through Danville, Lynchburg, and Lexington to West Virginia. In 1926, this was designated as U.S. Route 170 from North Carolina to Lynchburg and U.S. Route 60 from Lynchburg to West Virginia (except between Glasgow and Lexington, where US 60 used State Route 141 and State Route 33 via Natural Bridge). In the 1933 renumbering, the piece from Lynchburg to Lexington, including the Glasgow-Lexington section, became U.S. Route 501, as US 60 was rerouted to the north east of Lexington; all of SR 14 was removed in the 1933 renumbering.

Spurs of State Route 14 between 1923 and 1928
State Route 141, Natural Bridge Station to Natural Bridge, now part of State Route 130
State Route 142, Clifton Forge to Eagle Rock, now part of U.S. Route 220
State Route 143, Crows to West Virginia, now part of State Route 311
State Route 144, Danville to North Carolina, now State Route 86

SR 27

State Route 27 was a primary state highway in the U.S. state of Virginia. At its peak, it ran from near Powhatan to Sperryville via Columbia, Louisa, Orange, and Madison. The route was never continuous, with gaps filled by secondary routes. The route was at first known as State Route 16 from 1918 to 1940; the State Route 16 designation was needed in the 1940 renumbering to match other states, and so the road was SR 27 from 1940 to the final decommissioning in 1953.

The former SR 27 now carries the following designations:
State Route 684, U.S. Route 60 near Powhatan to State Route 45 near Cartersville
State Route 690, near Cartersville to State Route 6 in Columbia
State Route 659, Columbia to U.S. Route 250 at Ferncliff
State Route 208, Ferncliff to U.S. Route 33 in Louisa
State Route 669 and State Route 612, Louisa to U.S. Route 15 in Orange
State Route 230, US 15 at Madison Mills to U.S. Route 29 near Madison
State Route 231, Madison to U.S. Route 211 at Sperryville

In the initial 1918 state highway system, State Route 16 ran from State Route 2 (now U.S. Route 15) at Madison Mills to State Route 3 (now U.S. Route 11) at New Market via Madison and Luray, crossing the Blue Ridge Mountains at Fishers Gap. North of Madison, this was the path of the Blue Ridge Turnpike. In 1921, the State Highway Commission recommended that the legislature relocate SR 16 to run via Sperryville and Thornton Gap rather than Stanley to "eliminate a very difficult and expensive crossing of the Blue Ridge" and provide "a direct connection with the Lee Highway at Sperryville". By 1923, SR 16 was truncated to Sperryville; the piece from Sperryville west to New Market became an extension of State Route 21.

Major intersections

SR 33

State Route 33 was a primary state highway in the U.S. state of Virginia. It was first formed as part of the initial system in 1918; it was State Route 3 until 1923. SR 33 existed until 1933, when it was deemed redundant to the U.S. Routes that used it - U.S. Route 311 (now U.S. Route 220) from North Carolina to Roanoke, and U.S. Route 11 from Roanoke to West Virginia. The number was immediately reused for another route in southeastern Virginia, and in the late 1930s the current State Route 33, an extension of U.S. Route 33, was formed.

From Staunton to Winchester, SR 33 was the Valley Turnpike, taken over by the state in 1918. North of Winchester towards Martinsburg, West Virginia, SR 33 used the Winchester and Martinsburg Turnpike. Tolls were removed in 1919 when the turnpike company gave the road to the state.

Spurs of State Route 33 between 1923 and 1928
State Route 331, Woodstock west to West Virginia, now State Route 42 and several secondary routes
State Route 332, Mauzy west and north to West Virginia, now part of State Route 259
State Route 333, Harrisonburg west to West Virginia, now part of U.S. Route 33
State Route 334, Greenville east towards Waynesboro, now part of U.S. Route 340
State Route 335, Rocky Mount northeast to Bedford, now part of State Route 122
State Route 336, Mt. Jackson west to Orkney Springs, now State Route 263
State Route 337, Ridgeway southeast to North Carolina, now State Route 87
State Route 338, Lexington north, west and southwest to Covington, now parts of State Route 39 and Covington
State Route 339, Winchester northwest to Gainsboro, now part of U.S. Route 522

References